Dioptis vitrifera is a moth of the family Notodontidae first described by William Warren in 1905. It is found in Amazonian Peru.

References

Moths described in 1893
Notodontidae of South America